A tomato sandwich is a sandwich of tomatoes between slices of bread.  The bread of a tomato sandwich is typically spread with mayonnaise. A tomato sandwich may also be seasoned with salt, pepper, garlic, anchovies, parsley or basil. Adding cheese is also popular as an open-face sandwich.

Seasonal preparation
In the state of North Carolina they are most commonly associated with summer.

See also
 BLT sandwich
 List of sandwiches
 List of tomato dishes

References

Sandwiches
Tomato dishes